Trechodes is a genus of beetles in the family Carabidae, containing the following species:

 Trechodes alluaudi Jeannel, 1926
 Trechodes babaulti Jeannel, 1926
 Trechodes bakeri Jeannel, 1926
 Trechodes bipartitus (W.J.Macleay, 1871)
 Trechodes bitinctus (Sloane, 1923)
 Trechodes cauliops (Bates, 1892)
 Trechodes crypticus Moore, 1972
 Trechodes daffneri Casale, 1986
 Trechodes jeanneli Mateu, 1958
 Trechodes katanganus Basilewsky, 1958
 Trechodes kenyensis Jeannel, 1926
 Trechodes kilimanus Jeannel, 1926
 Trechodes laophilus Deuve, 2002
 Trechodes lebioderus (Chaudoir, 1876)
 Trechodes leclerci Deuve, 1987
 Trechodes leleupi Basilewsky, 1950
 Trechodes lepesmei Villiers, 1940
 Trechodes lucanerii Magrini, Sciaky & Bastianini, 2005
 Trechodes lustrans Moore, 1972
 Trechodes marshalli Jeannel, 1926
 Trechodes palawanensis Deuve, 2001
 Trechodes satoi Ueno, 1991
 Trechodes secalioides (Blackburn, 1891)
 Trechodes sicardi Alluaud, 1932
 Trechodes vadoni Jeannel, 1946

References

Trechinae